Neyyattinkara railway station NYY, is a major railway station (NSG 5 Category) in Kerala serving the capital Thiruvananthapuram district of Kerala. The station serves as the southern gateway to the capital city Trivandrum. Neyyattinkara railway station is the fourth-busiest after Trivandrum North and sixth most revenue generating railway station in the district managed by the Thiruvananthapuram Division of the Southern Railways. In 2018–19 FY, Neyyattinkara generated Rs 2.32cr profit from 1.7 million passengers.

Lines
The station is on the Thiruvananthapuram–Kanyakumari railway line.

Connections

Services
Trains passing by the Neyyattinkara railway station connects to Thiruvananthapuram, Kollam, Punalur, Ernakulam, Guruvayur, Mangalore, Chennai, Mumbai, Bangalore, Kanyakumari, Nagercoil, Madurai, Trichy,  etc.

See also
 Neyyattinkara
 
 Transport in Thiruvananthapuram
 Karunagappalli railway station

References

External links
 Indian Railways Official Website

Railway stations in Thiruvananthapuram district
Thiruvananthapuram railway division